Tell the Truth is a 1946 German comedy film directed by Helmut Weiss and starring Gustav Fröhlich, Mady Rahl, and Ingeborg von Kusserow. The film had a troubled production, and was originally filming in the final days of the Nazi era with Heinz Rühmann and his wife Hertha Feiler in the lead roles. Production was halted when Soviet forces took control of the Tempelhof Studios during the Battle of Berlin. The film was then remade in the British sector of Berlin with different leads but using substantial amounts of footage already shot during the previous production.

The film's sets were designed by Ernst H. Albrecht.

Cast

References

Bibliography

External links 
 

1946 films
1946 comedy films
German comedy films
West German films
1940s German-language films
Films directed by Helmut Weiss
German films based on plays
Terra Film films
Films shot at Tempelhof Studios
German black-and-white films
1940s German films